Anadolu Shipyard (ADİK) is a Turkish shipyard located in Tuzla, Istanbul. The shipyard mostly builds amphibious warfare ships as part of the defense industry.

History
Anadolu Shipyard was founded in the early 1950s. The company was initially active at Haliç Taşkızak in Golden Horn, Istanbul. In 1982, the shipyard moved to Tuzla, a district in the east of Istanbul.

By December 2004, the company had been taken over by Furtrans Shipping, which was about to construct a shipyard in Yalova. In 2005, Anadolu Shipyard and Sedef Shipyard established a joint venture with the TAIS Shipyards Company at Yalova with the purpose of building, repairing and maintaining naval ships of the Turkish Navy. The shipyard in Yalova has four shipways covering  of the shipyard area.

Overview
Anadolu Shipyard is situated on the Tersaneler Cad. 22 in Tuzla. In the beginning, the company built sailing yachts such as the -long Fortuna Blue in 1989, the -long Ofelia in 2000 and the -long Handem in 2002.

The production program covers small-sized Landing Craft Vehicle Personnels (LCVP), middle-size Landing Craft Mechanizeds (LCM), Landing Craft Tanks (LCT), Landing Ship, Tanks (LST) and Landing helicopter docks (LHD). Other ship designs include Offshore Patrol Vessels (OPV) of lengths , Fast attack crafts (FAC) and Landing Platform Docks (LPD). The shipyard is able to simultaneously build up to six vessels.

The company employs between 25 and 30 retired Turkish Navy personnel, including retired admirals and captains.

Ships for the Turkish Navy

In 2008, the company entered the defense industry with a project to build LCTs. Project planning for eight -long LCTs was accomplished in 2009 and the first ships were laid down in early 2010. All eight vessels were built and handed over to the Turkish Navy by 2012. These vessels are still the world's fastest in their class.

The shipyard delivered the -long Bayraktar-class LSTs  that was launched in 2015 and commissioned in 2017, and  that was launched in 2016 and commissioned in 2018 to the Turkish Navy.

Export
In October 2020,the -long Al Doha (QTS-91) of the Qatari Emiri Navy, the first of the two armed Cadet Training Ships that were ordered in 2018, was launched.  The first of two -long LCMs for the Qatari Emiri Navy was laid down in 2021.

Technology transfer
In 2020, India's state-owned Hindustan Shipyard in Visakhapatnam signed a contract with Anadolu Shipyard for a technology transfer project despite concerns that emerged in India in 2019 that Indian-rival and Turkey-friendly Pakistan could prevent such a defense-industry-related business relationship. The project was valued at  Rs 10,000 crore  – between US$1.5 and 2.0 billion – and aims to build five HSL-class fleet support ships, each of 45,000 DWT, for the Indian Navy by the Indian shipyard. The technology transfer provides for the preparation of specifications, planning and engineering services.

References 

Turkish companies established in 1982
Defence companies of Turkey
Shipyards of Turkey
Tuzla, Istanbul
Buildings and structures in Istanbul Province